Workin' & Wailin' is the third album led by pianist Harold Mabern which was recorded in 1968 and released on the Prestige label.

Reception

Allmusic awarded the album 3 stars stating "The date utilizes trumpeter Virgil Jones, tenor saxophonist George Coleman, bassist Buster Williams and drummer Idris Muhammad on four challenging Mabern originals and Johnny Mandel's "A Time for Love."

Track listing 
All compositions by Harold Mabern except as noted
 "Too Busy Thinking About My Baby" (Janie Bradford, Norman Whitfield, Barrett Strong) - 4:18   
 "Strozier's Mode" - 7:50   
 "Blues for Phineas" - 5:05   
 "I Can't Understand What I See in You" - 8:40   
 "Waltzing Westward" - 9:16   
 "A Time for Love" (Johnny Mandel, Paul Francis Webster) - 4:50

Personnel 
Harold Mabern - piano, electric piano
Virgil Jones - trumpet, flugelhorn
George Coleman - tenor saxophone
Buster Williams - bass
Leo Morris  - drums

References 

Harold Mabern albums
1969 albums
Prestige Records albums
Albums produced by Bob Porter (record producer)
Albums recorded at Van Gelder Studio